The Co-Cathedral of the Sacred Heart It is the name given to a religious building of the Catholic church that is located in the city of Bitola in North Macedonia and is the co-cathedral of the Diocese of Skopje. The establishment of the church dates back to the nineteenth century, by the Vincentians, who set out to spread the Catholic faith among the Orthodox population of the Ottoman Empire. The founder of the Church was Juan Jose Lepavek, who in 1857 bought a hotel from which to develop future church, completed in 1870, but destroyed by fire in 1900. The present church dates from 1909 and is neo-Gothic style. The church tower was built between 1938 and 1940.

See also
 Roman Catholicism in North Macedonia
 Co-Cathedral of the Sacred Heart

References

Roman Catholic cathedrals in North Macedonia
Buildings and structures in Bitola
Roman Catholic churches completed in 1909
20th-century Roman Catholic church buildings